Estadio Helmántico (English: Helmántico Stadium) is a football stadium in Salamanca, Spain where UD Salamanca played home matches, and is the home stadium of Salamanca CF UDS. The stadium holds 17,341 and was built in 1970. It is located in the municipality of Villares de la Reina, on the outskirts of the city.

The Stadium also has a mini-stadium where the team usually trains and once a year hosts an international athletic championship.  They are officially called "Javier Sotomayor", for Javier Sotomayor who set the world record in high jump there, but they are popularly called "Pistas del Helmántico". This second stadium hosts the matches of Salamanca CF UDS B.

In addition, there are also some swimming pools and tennis courts.

After the dissolution of UD Salamanca in 2013, the stadium went up for auction, finally being acquired by Desarrollos Empresariales Deportivos S.L., that allowed its use to CF Salmantino.

Gallery

References

External links
Estadios de Espana 

Football venues in Castile and León
UD Salamanca
Athletics (track and field) venues in Spain
Sports venues completed in 1970
Salamanca CF UDS